The 2016–17 Pepperdine Waves women's basketball team will represent Pepperdine University in the 2016–17 NCAA Division I women's basketball season. The Waves, members of the West Coast Conference, are led by fourth year coach Ryan Weisenberg. The Waves play their home games at the Firestone Fieldhouse on the university campus in Malibu, California. They finished the season 7–23, 5–13 in WCC play to finish in a tie for eighth place. They lost in the first round of the WCC women's tournament to Pacific.

On March 8, Ryan Weisenberg was fired. He finished at Pepperdine with a 4 year record of 28–94.

Roster

Schedule

|-
!colspan=9 style="background:#0021A5; color:#FF6200;"| Exhibition

|-
!colspan=9 style="background:#0021A5; color:#FF6200;"| Non-conference regular season

|-
!colspan=9 style="background:#0021A5; color:#FF6200;"| WCC regular season

|-
!colspan=9 style="background:#0021A5;"| WCC Women's Tournament

See also
 2016–17 Pepperdine Waves men's basketball team

References

Pepperdine
Pepperdine Waves women's basketball seasons
Pepperdine
Pepperdine